Propamocarb is a systemic fungicide used for control of soil, root and leaf disease caused by oomycetes. It is used by watering or spraying. Propamocarb is absorbed and distributed through the plant's tissue.

Use
Propamocarb has fungicidal activity only against oomycetes.

Safety
Propamocarb has low general toxicity, and almost no teratogenicity or neurotoxicity for mammals. It is not a carcinogen nor mutagen. Propamocarb is not susceptible to formation of resistant diseases. It is fully metabolized by plants and aquatic bacteria in a few weeks, so it is not a major ecological threat. It carries the risk of skin sensitization. Oral  is 2900 mg/kg for male rats and 2000 mg/kg for female rats.

In one study conducted on tobacco, cucumber and spinach, using propamocarb synthesized out of carbon C14 radionuclide, researchers stated that propamocarb is decomposed down to carbon dioxide and then incorporated into the plant's natural compounds, such as amino acids.

References

Acetylcholinesterase inhibitors

Fungicides
Carbamates
Propyl esters